The Anabaptist Association of Australia and New Zealand (AAANZ) is a network of individuals from a variety of Christian denominations in Australia and New Zealand who share a common interest in the Anabaptist tradition.

In 1998 the body was incorporated with about 80 members. The association believes that the enduring legacy of the Anabaptists includes: 

 baptism upon profession of faith  
 church membership is voluntary and members are accountable to the Bible (read through the revelation of Jesus) and to each other 
 commitment to the way of peace and other teachings of Jesus as a rule for life 
 separation of church and state 
 worshipping congregations which create authentic community and reach out through vision and service

Annual meetings
1998 
1999, Wollongong, New South Wales, Australia
2000
2001, Melbourne, Australia
2003, Sydney, Australia
2005, Canberra, Australia
2007, Perth, Australia
2009, Melbourne, Australia
2011, New Zealand

Notes

External links
Official website

Protestantism in Australia
Protestantism in New Zealand
Christian organizations established in 1998
Anabaptist denominations established in the 20th century